Bill Cahill may refer to:
 Bill Cahill (American football) (born 1951), American professional football player
 Bill Cahill (Australian footballer) (1911–1966), Australian rules footballer
 Bill Cahill (hurler) (1923–2001), Irish hurler

See also
William Cahill (disambiguation)